Sir Robert Bland Bird, 2nd Baronet KBE (20 September 1876 – 20 November 1960) was a Conservative Party politician in the United Kingdom.

Biography 

He was elected as Member of Parliament (MP) for Wolverhampton West at a by-election in March 1922 following the death of his father Sir Alfred, who had been the constituency's MP since January 1910.

Robert Bird was re-elected at the next three general elections, but was defeated at the 1929 general election by the Labour Party candidate William Brown.  Bird regained the seat in 1931, and held it until he stood down at the 1945 general election.

Bird had succeeded to his father's baronetcy, and also succeeded him as chairman of the family's business Alfred Bird and Sons, manufacturing chemists. The company had been established by his grandfather Alfred Bird, who invented both baking powder and custard powder.

He was invested as a Chevalier in the French Légion d'honneur in 1947 and as an Officer of the Order of Leopold (Belgium) (in recognition of services rendered to Belgian interests during World War II) in 1951. In the New Year Honours in 1954, he was made a Knight Commander of the Order of the British Empire (KBE), "for political and public services". Away from politics he was a keen photographer and a member of the Royal Photographic Society from 1915 until 1960. He produced an important body of early colour photography using the autochrome process between c1915 and 1920 some of which was exhibited in the RPS's annual exhibition.

Notes

References

ThePeerage.com

External links 
 

1876 births
1960 deaths
Bird, Sir Robert, 2nd Baronet
Conservative Party (UK) MPs for English constituencies
UK MPs 1918–1922 
UK MPs 1922–1923
UK MPs 1923–1924
UK MPs 1924–1929
UK MPs 1931–1935
UK MPs 1935–1945
Knights Commander of the Order of the British Empire
Chevaliers of the Légion d'honneur